NGC 86 is a lenticular galaxy estimated to be between 275 and 300 million light-years away in the constellation of Andromeda. It was discovered by Guillaume Bigourdan in 1884 and its apparent magnitude is 14.9.

References

External links
 

0086
Lenticular galaxies
Andromeda (constellation)
18841114
Discoveries by Guillaume Bigourdan